Neelakantapuram is a village and panchayat in Kurupam mandal of Parvathipuram Manyam district, Andhra Pradesh, India.

References
Villages in Parvathipuram Manyam district